The 2013 London Broncos season was the thirty-fourth in the club's history and their eighteenth season in the Super League. Competing in Super League XVIII, the club was coached by Tony Rea, finishing in 13th place and reaching the Semi-finals of the 2013 Challenge Cup.

It was the 18th season of the Super League era and their second since returning to the London Broncos name. They came within one match of the Challenge Cup final but finished the Super League season in second to last place.

2013 milestones
In August 2012 Tony Rea was named the Bronco's coach for the 2013 season, after serving in a caretaker capacity in the second half of the 2012 season.

Squad

Super League XVIII table

2013 fixtures and results
Super League XVIII

2013 transfers in/out

In

Out

References

London Broncos seasons
London Broncos
London Broncos season